Cynthia Jane Kenyon (born February 21, 1954) is an American molecular biologist and biogerontologist known for her genetic dissection of aging in a widely used model organism, the roundworm Caenorhabditis elegans. She is the vice president of aging research at Calico Research Labs, and emeritus professor of biochemistry and biophysics at the University of California, San Francisco (UCSF).

Career
Cynthia Kenyon graduated valedictorian in chemistry and biochemistry from the University of Georgia in 1976. She received her Ph.D. in 1981 from MIT where, in Graham Walker's laboratory, she looked for genes on the basis of their activity profiles, discovering that DNA-damaging agents activate a battery of DNA repair genes in E. coli. She then did postdoctoral studies with Nobel laureate Sydney Brenner at the MRC Laboratory of Molecular Biology in Cambridge, England, studying the development of C. elegans.

Since 1986 she has been at the UCSF, where she was the Herbert Boyer Distinguished Professor of Biochemistry and Biophysics and is now an American Cancer Society Professor. In 1999, she co-Elixir Pharmaceuticals with Leonard Guarente to try to discover and develop drugs that would slow down the process that makes people age.

In April 2014, Kenyon was named Vice President of Aging Research at Calico, a new company focused on health, well-being, and longevity. Prior to that, she served as a part-time advisor beginning in November 2013. Kenyon remains affiliated with UCSF as an emeritus professor.

Her early work led to the discovery that Hox genes, which were known to pattern the body segments of the fruit fly (Drosophila) also pattern the body of C. elegans. These findings demonstrated that Hox genes were not simply involved in segmentation, as thought, but instead were part of a much more ancient and fundamental metazoan patterning system.

Michael Klass discovered that lifespan of C. elegans could be altered by mutations, but Klass believed that the effect was due to reduced food consumption (caloric restriction). Thomas Johnson later showed that the 65% life extension effect was due to the mutation itself rather than due to caloric restriction. In 1993,  Kenyon's discovery that a single-gene mutation (Daf-2) could double the lifespan of C. elegans and that this could be reversed by a second mutation in daf-16m, sparked an intensive study of the molecular biology of aging, including work by Leonard Guarente and David Sinclair. Kenyon's findings have led to the discovery that an evolutionarily conserved hormone signaling system influences aging in other organisms, perhaps also including mammals.

Kenyon has received many honors, including the King Faisal Prize for Medicine, the Association of American Medical Colleges Award for Distinguished Research, the Ilse & Helmut Wachter Award for Exceptional Scientific Achievement, and La Fondation IPSEN Prize, for her findings. She is a member of the U.S. National Academy of Sciences and the American Academy of Arts and Sciences.  She was President of the Genetics Society of America for 2003.

Personal diet
Kenyon's research prompted her to make personal dietary changes.

In 2000, when she discovered that putting sugar on the worms' food shortened their lifespans, she stopped eating high glycemic index carbohydrates and started eating a low-carbohydrate diet.

She briefly experimented with a calorie restriction diet for two days, but couldn't stand the constant hunger.

See also
 Genetics of aging

References

External links
 Basic Research: Cynthia Kenyon by Steven Kotler in Discover, vol. 25, no. 11, 2004
 Cynthia Kenyon's Seminar: Genes that Control Aging
 Cynthia Kenyon Talk: A Genetic Control Circuit for Aging
 In Methuselah's Mould, an open-access interview discussing Kenyon's research and her personal low carb diet.
 

American women biochemists
American biophysicists
American geneticists
Women biophysicists
American women geneticists
Biogerontologists
Women medical researchers
University of Georgia alumni
Massachusetts Institute of Technology alumni
University of California, San Francisco faculty
Members of the United States National Academy of Sciences
1955 births
Living people
Life extensionists
21st-century American women
Members of the National Academy of Medicine